The year 2017 was the 8th year in the history of the Road Fighting Championship, a mma promotion based in South Korea. 2017 started with Road FC 036 and ended with Road FC 045 XX.

List of events

Road FC 045 XX 

Xiaomi Road FC 045 XX was an MMA event held by Road FC on December 23, 2017 at the Convention Centre, Grand Hilton Seoul in Seoul, South Korea.  The 2nd event 'Road FC 045 XX' of the all-female MMA league Road FC XX was held on the main card.

Results

Road FC 044 

Xiaomi Road FC 044 was an MMA event held by Road FC on November 11, 2017 at the Hebei Gymnasium in Shijiazhuang, Hebei, China.

Results

Road FC 043 

Xiaomi Road FC 043 was an MMA event held by Road FC on October 28, 2017 at the Jangchung Gymnasium in Seoul, South Korea.

Results

Road FC 042 x Chungju World Martial Arts Festival 

Xiaomi Road FC 042 x Chungju World Martial Arts Festival was an MMA event held by Road FC on September 23, 2017 at the Chungju World Martial Arts Festival Stadium in Chungju, Chungcheongbuk-do, South Korea.

Results

Road FC 041 

Xiaomi Road FC 041  was an MMA event held by Road FC on August 12, 2017 at the Wonju Gymnasium in Wonju, Gangwon-do, South Korea.

Results

Road FC 040 

Xiaomi Road FC 040  was an MMA event held by Road FC on July 15, 2017 at the Jangchung Gymnasium in Seoul, South Korea.

Results

Road FC 039 

Xiaomi Road FC 039  was an MMA event held by Road FC on June 10, 2017 at the Jangchung Gymnasium in Seoul, South Korea.

Results

Road FC 038 

Xiaomi Road FC 038 was an MMA event held by Road FC on April 15, 2017 at the Jangchung Gymnasium in Seoul, South Korea.

Results

Road FC 037 XX 

Xiaomi Road FC 037 XX  was an MMA event held by Road FC on March 11, 2017 at the Convention Centre, Grand Hilton Seoul in Seoul, South Korea. The 1st event 'Road FC 037 XX' of the all-female MMA league Road FC XX was held on the main card. Road FC XX(pronounced “double x”, as in female chromosomes) is the official name for the league that showcased all-female fight cards on Road FC events. Road FC XX celebrates the rise in popularity in women's MMA, as well as the increasing number of talented female fighters in South Korea and abroad.

Results

Road FC 036 

Xiaomi Road FC 036 was an MMA event held by Road FC on February 11, 2017 at the Jangchung Gymnasium in Seoul, South Korea.

Results

See also
 List of Road FC events
 List of Road FC champions
 List of current Road FC fighters
 List of current mixed martial arts champions

References

Road Fighting Championship events
2017 in mixed martial arts
2017 in South Korean sport
2017 in Asian sport